The 1927 Tour de France was the 21st edition of the Tour de France, one of cycling's Grand Tours. The Tour began in Paris with a team time trial on 19 June, and Stage 12 occurred on 2 July with a mountainous stage to Perpignan. The race finished in Paris on 17 July.

Stage 1
19 June 1927 - Paris to Dieppe,  (TTT)

Stage 2
20 June 1927 - Dieppe to Le Havre,  (TTT)

Stage 3
21 June 1927 - Le Havre to Caen,  (TTT)

Stage 4
22 June 1927 - Caen to Cherbourg-en-Cotentin,  (TTT)

Stage 5
23 June 1927 - Cherbourg-en-Cotentin to Dinan,  (TTT)

Stage 6
24 June 1927 - Dinan to Brest,  (TTT)

Stage 7
25 June 1927 - Brest to Vannes,  (TTT)

Stage 8
26 June 1927 - Vannes to Les Sables d'Olonne,  (TTT)

Stage 9
27 June 1927 - Les Sables d'Olonne to Bordeaux,  (TTT)

Stage 10
28 June 1927 - Bordeaux to Bayonne,

Stage 11
30 June 1927 - Bayonne to Luchon,

Stage 12
2 July 1927 - Luchon to Perpignan,

References

1927 Tour de France
Tour de France stages